The AARP Movies for Grownups Award for Best Time Capsule is one of the AARP Movies for Grownups Awards presented annually by the AARP. The award honors the film that best encapsulates a specific period in history, usually from the twentieth century. The award for Best Time Capsule was first given in 2003, when the awards expanded beyond their initial categories of Best Movie for Grownups, Best Director, Best Actor, Best Actress, Best Documentary, Best Foreign Film, and Best Movie for Grownups Who Refuse to Grow Up.

No films were nominated for or awarded Best Time Capsule between 2006 and 2011. No explanation was given for the award's disappearance, or for its return with the 2011 awards.

Winners and Nominees

2000s

2010s

2020s

References

Time Capsule